Lars Arentz-Hansen (17 November 1927 – 23 March 2009) was a Norwegian barrister.

He was born in Kristiansund and took the cand.jur. degree in 1951. In 1966 he established the law firm Bugge, Arentz-Hansen og Rasmussen (BA-HR) together with Knut Rasmussen and Frederik Moltke Bugge, which became one of Norway's most prestigious law firms.

He also chaired the mountaineering society Norsk Tindeklub from 1966 to 1969.

References

1927 births
2009 deaths
People from Kristiansund
20th-century Norwegian lawyers
Norwegian mountain climbers